Naza Football Club is a football club competing in the Malaysian Super League. The club is based in Kuala Muda, Kedah. This team is a product of the Malaysian motor trading, automotive franchises, property development, food and beverage and hotel management company, Naza Group of Companies.

The club plays in the top division of Malaysian football, the Malaysian Super League. Their home stadium is the Darul Aman Stadium located in Alor Star, Kedah which they share with the main states team Kedah FA.

In 2014, the club was re-established and joined the KFA State League. Their vision was to join back to the M-League, especially to the Malaysia Super League in 2017.

Honours

Sponsorship
For the season of KFA State League running from 2014, Modenas and Naza Group of Companies was the club's first shirt sponsor. The manufacturer is Joma.

Kit manufacturers and financial sponsor

Managers

Coaches

External links
 Official club's website
 Naza Group website

Football clubs in Malaysia
Association football clubs established in 2004
Association football clubs disestablished in 2015